Dylan Paul Reese (born August 29, 1984) is an American former professional ice hockey defenseman. He last played with HV71 in the Swedish Hockey League (SHL).

Early life
Reese, who is Jewish, was born in Pittsburgh, Pennsylvania. He is the son of Barry and Marcie Reese, grandson of Rita Reese and Agnes and Richard Hornak, and has a brother named Evan.  He attended Upper St. Clair High School.

Playing career
Reese was drafted in 2000, in round 16 (#323 overall) by Belleville Bulls in the OHL Priority Selection. He was then drafted in 2002, in round 1 (#9 overall) by the Lincoln Stars in the USHL Entry Draft.

Reese was drafted 209th overall in the 2003 NHL Entry Draft by the New York Rangers. He played collegiate hockey with Harvard of the ECAC where he won two conference championships as well as made three NCAA tournament appearances. After missing 15 games his freshman season, including the 2004 World Junior Championships due to a back injury, Reese bounced back to have an outstanding sophomore campaign in 2004–05. He led all Crimson defensemen in scoring with 19 points (7 goals, 12 assists) playing in all 34 games that season. Reese, who played alongside senior Ryan Lannon for nearly the entire year, was a member of one of the best defensive corps in the nation. He went on to lead Harvard defensemen in scoring each of the next two seasons while being named team captain and MVP his senior year. In both 2005-2006 and in 2006-2007 he was an NCAA (ECAC) Second All-Star Team.

Reese made his professional debut in the 2007–08 season with the Phoenix Coyotes affiliate, the San Antonio Rampage of the AHL. He played in 59 games, but his contributions were minimal as he was often scratched in favor of veteran defensemen Travis Roche, Bryan Helmer and Brendan Bell. In the 2008–09 season, Reese's ice time was increased significantly as he was again paired with former Harvard teammate Ryan Lannon on the back end. Although the Rampage remained near the bottom of the pack all season Reese showed significant development as he contributed 28 points and played regularly in all situations.

In the summer of 2009 Reese received a contract with the Columbus Blue Jackets after attending their camp on a tryout basis. He was immediately assigned to Columbus' American League affiliate the Syracuse Crunch. He played in 51 games for the Crunch scoring 22 points and recording a team best +12 rating. Then, on March 1, two days before the NHL trade deadline Reese was dealt to the New York Islanders in exchange for Islanders forward Greg Moore. After reporting to the Islanders' AHL affiliate the Bridgeport Sound Tigers for one game, where he recorded a goal and an assist, Reese was recalled by the Islanders where he remained the rest of the season. Reese finished the season with two goals, two assists, and a +4 rating.

Reese began the 2010–11 AHL season with the Islanders' top AHL affiliate, the Bridgeport Sound Tigers, but on November 15, 2010 the defenseman was recalled to the NHL.

After a single season within the Pittsburgh Penguins organization in the 2012–13 season, Reese opted to leave North America and sign with Russian club, Amur Khabarovsk in the KHL. He said of his experience: "[Khabarovsk] is the coldest city. It was literally negative 20 for like one month straight; I’m not kidding... People treated me well, but at the same time, I didn’t understand what anyone was saying."

On July 1, 2014, Reese returned to the NHL in signing a one-year two-way contract with the Arizona Coyotes.

On July 18, 2016, as a free agent following the completion of his contract with the Coyotes, Reese left for abroad, agreeing to a one-year deal with Swedish club, HV71 of the SHL.

Career statistics

Awards and honors

See also
List of select Jewish ice hockey players

References

External links 

1984 births
Living people
American men's ice hockey defensemen
Amur Khabarovsk players
Arizona Coyotes players
Bridgeport Sound Tigers players
Hartford Wolf Pack players
Harvard Crimson men's ice hockey players
HV71 players
Ice hockey people from Pittsburgh
Jewish American sportspeople
Jewish ice hockey players
New York Islanders players
New York Rangers draft picks
Pittsburgh Penguins players
Portland Pirates players
San Antonio Rampage players
Springfield Falcons players
Syracuse Crunch players
Texas Tornado players
Wilkes-Barre/Scranton Penguins players
21st-century American Jews